Peter Kimbowa (born 26 February 1957) is a Ugandan entrepreneur, management consultant, author and speaker. He currently serves as the Chairman of the Board for the National Social Security Fund in Uganda. He is the founder of CEO Summit Uganda, the CEO Apprenticeship Program (CAP) jointly conducted with Strathmore Business School Kenya and the University of Cape Town, and the Managing Partner of IFE Consultants. Kimbowa is a certified trainer by the World Trade Organization and the International Finance Corporation of the World Bank and is a Certified Public Sector Procurement Expert. He is a regular platform speaker at Universities in East Africa, Africa, and the United States. He was seconded by The Ministry of Finance Planning and Economic Development as a Project Coordinator to UNCTAD/WTO/ITC from 1996 to 2001 and to the World Bank to formulate the Strategic Plan for the establishment of the Public Procurement and Disposal Authority in the same year.

Peter was born at Nsambya Hospital, Kampala. After graduating from Makerere University in 1980, he joined the Kenyan government as a civil servant and worked for the National Examination Council from 1981 to 1985. He served as a tutor under Kenya Teacher's Service Commission.

Early life and career 

Kimbowa was born on 26 February 1957 at Nsambya Hospital in Kampala. He was born to the Jacob and Anna Maria Nantale Kivumbi, both farmers. Both his parents were of Baganda descent.

On his birth, Kimbowa was announced dead, but it was his mother's efforts and experience as a first-generation midwife that saved his life from the pronunciation.

He grew up on his father's estate, Jacob Kivumbi Estate, located in Kisasi, 2 kilometers outside Lugazi Town, Mukono district.

Education background 

After attending his lower primary education level at Namilyango Junior Boys School (primary one to five) in 1968, Kimbowa joined Nswanjere Junior Seminary from 1969 to 1970 for his higher primary education (primary six to seven).

He joined Kisubi Minor Seminary from 1971 to 1974 for his Ordinary level education where he occupied the Head Prefect office in 1973. During his ordinary level vacation, Kimbowa  worked for The Sugar Corporation of Uganda. He worked in the Inventory Management Office, an office he later found in the Central Purchasing Corporation in the Ministry of Finance.

From 1975 to 1976 Kimbowa was a student of St. Henry's College Kitovu for his Advanced Level Education. He was a renowned debater who attracted headlines at the United Nations Mock Debates, a debating competition among the top tier schools in Uganda. His debating skills prompted his urge to exchange ideas, a reason behind his part-time teaching gigs in his Advanced level education vacation.

In 1977, he moved to Kampala district to attain his Bachelor of Arts degree with a concurrent Diploma in Education at Makerere University. He accomplished his undergraduate degree and diploma in 1980.

He mastered Business Administration specializing in Strategic Management at ESAMI in 2003. Five years later from Common Wealth University, Kimbowa attained his PhD. In 2018, a few months after attaining his PhD, he was certified by Accredited Coach Training Program at Strathmore Business School, Kenya as a professional coach.

As a scholar, Kimbowa has authored over seventeen books which, to him, string among his biggest achievements. Among these books are; Retire Happy, Corporate Key Performance Indicators, Financial Literacy Work Book, Investment Guide, Personal Wellness Manual, Sustainability Manual, CEO in Transition, Coaching Guide, Governance Manual, Family Business Manual, Small and Growing Business Manual, Innovation Box, 500+ Pandemic Business Opportunities, and Executive Coaching Guide.

Professional career 
In his early years, Kimbowa started as a volunteer in the Sugar Corporation of Uganda before part-timing as a teacher in his Advanced level vacation. Professionally, in 1985, he was appointed by the Kenyan Government as a civil servant to work in the education sector in Nairobi. He worked as an administrator and a tutor until 1986. He came back to Uganda in 1986 and joined the President's office.

He was a Research Officer on Economic Affairs. He joined the Ministry of Finance as the Director of Procurement where he was responsible for issuing the logistics contracts for the importation of government consignments.

He worked for the UN under ITC/UNCTAD /World Trade Organization as a National Project Coordinator from 1996 to 2001 before consulting on a World Bank project to draw out the Strategic Plan for the establishment of Public Procurement and Disposal Reform Strategy from 2001 to 2002.

Starting in 2002 he went into private consultancy on Governance, Innovation and Technology Systems, Leadership Development, Research, Coaching, and Capacity building. He has since started several companies like CEO Summit Uganda, The CEO Apprenticeship Programme (CAP), League of East African Directors (LEAD) with Strathmore Business School, IFE Consults Limited - which was awarded the International Arch of Europe for quality and Excellence Gold category in Paris, 2009.

Apppointed as the NSSF (Uganda) Board Chairman. He is the current Chairman of Nsambya Estate Redevelopment (Kampala Arch Diocese Land Board - KALB) and Lugazi Industrial Park. He doubles as the Board Member and Advisor at ESKOM (U), Jubilee Allianz Insurance Uganda, and Uganda Red Cross. He is an outgoing Board Member of Equity Bank Uganda where he served for seven years. He is the director at the Joint Venture Companies - Kiira Motors, Tondeka Metro, and RentCo Uganda.

He is a Process and Resource Consultant on retainer in the Banking, Manufacturing, Power, and Telecom sectors. He is a member of the Africa CEO Forum and a Pioneering Consultant who has helped in setting up Investment clubs in Uganda (since 2010/2011).

Family and personal life 
Of the twelve children of his father, Peter is the eleventh child. He heirs his father as well. He is a Muganda of the Ngonge Clan (otter).

In 1992, Kimbowa met his wife, Christine Magala, then a senior teacher at St. Mary's College Namagunga. She is now an independent People and Organizational Development Specialist. 
They got married in 1995 and together they have four children; two boys and two girls. A pair being twins.
Religiously Kimbowa subscribes to the Catholic Church.
Kimbowa is a fluent speaker of English and Luganda language. He is proficient in Kiswahili and a beginner in the Mandarin language.

References

External links 
 

Ugandan businesspeople
Living people
Ganda people
People from Kampala
1957 births